John Belding (also recorded as John Beldon or John Belden) (January 9, 1650 – November 26, 1713) was an early settler of Norwalk, Connecticut. He was a member of the General Assembly of the Colony of Connecticut from Norwalk in the sessions of October 1691 and May 1705.

He was most likely the son of William Belding and Thomasine Sherwood, although at least one record shows his father as John Belding of Wethersfield. He was the brother of Daniel Belden, the early settler of Deerfield, Massachusetts.

He is recorded as living in Norwalk as early as 1673.

On April 30, 1690, he was appointed to a committee to fortify the meeting house.

On January 16, 1694, he was appointed to a committee to replace the deceased Reverend Thomas Hanford as minister for the town.

In 1708, he was one of the purchasers of Ridgefield, along with Matthew Seymour, Matthias St. John, and Samuel Keeler.

He died in 1713, and his widow, Ruth married John Copp, the town clerk.

Notable descendants 
 Grandfather of Thomas Belden, member of the Connecticut House of Representatives

References 

1650 births
1713 deaths
American Puritans
Deputies of the Connecticut General Assembly (1662–1698)
Members of the Connecticut House of Representatives
Politicians from Norwalk, Connecticut
People from Wethersfield, Connecticut
King Philip's War
People of colonial Connecticut